Sathiaraj s/o Krishna Murthy (born 15 October 1986) is a former Young Lions defender who last played for Geylang International FC in the S-League.

He was from the COE youth Balestier Central FC at the year 2001 and 2002 under former national player Nasaruddin jalil. He played COE Balestier Khalsa Fc under18 at the year 2003 under Coach Zai. K. Sathiaraj got spotted by the previous (Singapore) under18 coach Mike Wong against Geylang United U18 and got called up for NFA (Sinagpore) U18 squad the year 2004. He joined Balestier Khalsa Prime League team year 2005 and 2006. 

At the Year 2006 K. Sathiaraj make his first appearance for Balestier Khalsa in a S.League game against Alberix. He was sub in the match at 75 mins by coach Karim. He played few S.league matches the same year.

K.Sathiaraj was offered his Professional contract by Balestier Khalsa Fc the Year 2007. He started his professional career with Coach Nasaruddin jalil.

He joined Woodlands Wellington in the 2011 S-League off-season together with his coach and mentor at Balestier Khalsa, Salim Moin, as well as his Tigers teammates Ahmadulhaq Che Omar, Armanizam Dolah and Shamsurin Abdul Rahman.

With Woodlands vice-captain Duncan David Elias slotting in at left back, Sathiaraj usually plays at right back although he is equally adept at playing on either side of the pitch.

On 23 November 2012, it was announced by Woodlands Wellington that he would not be retained for the 2013 season.

Club career statistics

All numbers encased in brackets signify substitute appearances.

References

Singaporean footballers
Living people
1986 births
Balestier Khalsa FC players
Woodlands Wellington FC players
Singapore Premier League players
Association football defenders
Young Lions FC players
Singaporean people of Tamil descent
Singaporean sportspeople of Indian descent